U Taphao or U Tapao may refer to:

 U-Tapao International Airport in Rayong Province, Thailand
 U-Tapao Royal Thai Navy Airfield, which occupies the same facilities as the above
 U-Tapao Station, a planned station in the Don Mueang–Suvarnabhumi–U-Tapao high-speed railway, serving the airport
 U Taphao Subdistrict in Manorom District, Chai Nat Province
 Khlong U Taphao, a river in Songkhla Province
 U-taphao Junction, a railway station in Songkhla Province, superseded by Hat Yai Junction railway station

See also
 Utapau (Star Wars)